Héctor José Cámpora (26 March 190918 December 1980) was an Argentine politician. A major figure of left-wing Peronism, Cámpora was briefly Argentine president from 25 May to 13 July 1973 and subsequently arranged for Perón to run for president in an election that he subsequently won. The modern left-wing Peronist political youth organization La Cámpora is named after him. He was a dentist by trade.

Early life 
Cámpora, affectionately known as el Tío (the Uncle), was born as Héctor José Cámpora Demaestre on March 26, 1909, in the city of Mercedes, in the Province of Buenos Aires. He earned a degree in dentistry in Córdoba University and practiced his profession in his hometown before moving to nearby San Andrés de Giles.

From 1945 to 1970 

Cámpora knew General Juan Perón when the latter visited San Andrés de Giles as minister of labour in 1944. After Perón was elected president in 1946, Cámpora led an independent coalition of labourists and radicals and won a seat in the house of representatives, which he presided during the period 1948–1952. He was commissioned for a diplomatic trip through 17 countries as plenipotentiary ambassador in 1953. He was arrested and indicted for corruption and embezzlement by the Revolución Libertadora which overthrew Perón in 1955. After fleeing the country in 1956, he returned three years later when all the charges were dropped.

From 1971 to July 1973 

Perón chose him as his "personal delegate" in 1971. He ran for president in 1973 to circumvent the veto on Perón's participation in the election which had been issued by Argentine dictator General Alejandro Lanusse. His running-mate was Vicente Solano Lima. Despite Cámpora's own left-leaning tendencies, Solano Lima belonged to the Popular Conservative Party.

Cámpora won the March 1973 election with 49.6% of the votes. The Radical leader, Ricardo Balbín, had arrived second with 21.3%, but it was enough to include him in the runoff with Cámpora, as absolute majority was necessary to avoid a second ballot. However, he resigned his right in order to avoid a political crisis, and recognized his defeat. Cámpora assumed his functions on 25 May 1973, in the presence of Chilean President Salvador Allende and Cuban President Osvaldo Dorticós. A million people gathered on the Plaza de Mayo to acclaim the new President.

One of Cámpora's first presidential actions was a granting of amnesty to members of terrorist organizations who had carried out political assassinations and terror attacks against military and police personnel and who had been tried and sentenced to prison by judges.

On 28 May Argentina restored diplomatic relations with Cuba, which then received Argentine aid such as food and industrial products to break the United States embargo against Cuba.

During Cámpora's first months of government, approximatively 600 social conflicts, strikes and factory occupations had taken place. The revolutionary left had however suspended armed struggle, joining itself to the participatory democracy process, which created alarms in the Peronist right-wing bureaucracy.

Cámpora's ideology set him against the right-wing tendencies of Peronism. When Perón returned to Argentina on 20 June 1973, his plane had to be redirected to a military airport because of fighting between armed Peronist factions that had massed to greet his arrival at Buenos Aires's main airport. This event, known as the Ezeiza Massacre, left 13 killed and more than 300 wounded.

José Ber Gelbard, president of the CGE, a small and medium-sized enterprise association, was designated as minister of economics. Gelbard tried to establish a "social pact" among the CGT workers and the "National Bourgeoisie", including a price freeze and widespread salary hikes.

Finally, on 13 July 1973, Cámpora resigned to allow Juan Perón to return to power. New elections were held on 23 September, twelve days after the Chilean coup. Cámpora was later designated as Argentine ambassador to Mexico.

July 1973 to 1980 

After the March 1976 coup d'état that displaced Perón's successor, his widow Isabel Perón, Cámpora sought refuge at the Mexican embassy in Buenos Aires. Three years later, after being diagnosed with cancer, he was allowed to fly to Mexico. Cámpora died in Cuernavaca a few months after his arrival, in December 1980.

See also 
Peronism
Montoneros
Movimiento Nacionalista Tacuara
Ezeiza massacre

References

External links 
Enciclopedia Libre Universal en Español - Héctor José Cámpora. Original version in Spanish, released under GNU FDL.

|-

1909 births
1980 deaths
People from Mercedes, Buenos Aires
Argentine people of Italian descent
National University of Córdoba alumni
Argentine dentists
Presidents of Argentina
Presidents of the Argentine Chamber of Deputies
Members of the Argentine Chamber of Deputies elected in Buenos Aires Province
Justicialist Party politicians
Deaths from lung cancer
Deaths from cancer in Mexico
Ambassadors of Argentina to Mexico
20th-century dentists